The Rabbis' Sons is a Jewish music group that released most of its albums between 1967 and 1974.  It consisted of Rabbis Baruch Chait (main composer, guitar), Label Sharfman (vocals), Itzy Weinberger (vocals) and Michael Zheutlin (vocals, composer, guitar, piano, other instruments), with David Nulman on steel guitar and Mickey Lane on bass fiddle.  The group got its name because Chait, Sharfman and Weinberger were all sons of rabbis.

Their musical style was influenced by Chassidic music and American folk music and by the music of Shlomo Carlebach.  Distinctive features of their sound were the presence of three-part harmonies and acoustic guitar playing in many of their songs.  Lyrics were typically in Hebrew and derived from sections of zemiros, hallel and tefila.  The music was composed primarily by Chait with some compositions by Zheutlin and others.

History
Weinberger and Zheutlin were friends from their high school days at the Rabbi Jacob Joseph Yeshiva.  They met Sharfman at Camp Morasha.  The three of them enrolled at Yeshiva University and honed their singing talents there. In November 1966, Chait, a student at the Chofetz Chaim yeshiva, where Dovid Nulman and Barry Septimus were also students, heard the three in a performance at Yeshiva University.  He sent them demo tapes containing some of his original compositions and asked them to record the songs.  Eventually, in early 1967, the four of them created The Rabbis’ Sons and recorded their first album.  One of their highlights of that year was to be invited to perform at the Salute to Israel – Rheingold Music Festival on July 2 in New York City's Central Park.  It was a rally celebrating Israel's victory in the Six Day War.

The Rabbis' Sons released four albums in their heyday (see Discography).  All four of the primary members were present on the first two albums (Chait to a lesser degree on the second album).  Only Chait and Zheutlin were present on the third album and Weinberger rejoined the group for the fourth album.  Among their most famous songs were Rabos Machshovos, Mi Ho-ish, Hal'lu, Tov Lehodos and Harachaman.
	
A compilation album was released in 1977.

Aftermath
Baruch Chait would later form Kol Salonika and Label Sharfman would later form D'veykus.  Itzy Weinberger also contributed vocals to some D'veykus songs.  Additionally, D'veykus has recorded some tunes that were composed by Chait and by Zheutlin.

Reunion
In 1991, all four of the original Rabbis' Sons reunited to perform a charity concert in Carnegie Hall for the Shorashim organization.  In 1996, they released an album with all new material.  In 2007 (after the passing of Michael Zheutlin in 2002), it was thought that The Rabbis' Sons would release another album but this has yet to come about.

Discography

References
 Chavrusa (April 2007, p. 12): Rabbis' Sons: Rabbinic Fathers – Itzy Weinberger (archived from the original - Nov. 8, 2012)
  Dartmouth Jewish Sound Archive (Free registration / search for "Rabbis" in the search box)
  FAU Judaica Sound Archives

External links
 Hebrew Wikipedia article on The Rabbis' Sons

Musical groups established in 1967
Hasidic music
Jewish musical groups
Musical groups disestablished in 1996
Jewish folk singers
Shlomo Carlebach